An executive information system (EIS), also known as an executive support system (ESS), is a type of management support system that facilitates and supports senior executive information and decision-making needs. It provides easy access to internal and external information relevant to organizational goals. It is commonly considered a specialized form of decision support system (DSS).

EIS emphasizes graphical displays and easy-to-use user interfaces. They offer strong reporting and drill-down capabilities. In general, EIS are enterprise-wide DSS that help top-level executives analyze, compare, and highlight trends in important variables so that they can monitor performance and identify opportunities and problems. EIS and data warehousing technologies are converging in the marketplace.

The term EIS lost popularity in favor of business intelligence (with the sub areas of reporting, analytics, and digital dashboards).

History 

Traditionally, executive information systems were mainframe computer-based programs. The purpose was to package a company's data and to provide sales performance or market research statistics for decision makers, such as, marketing directors, chief executive officer, who were not necessarily well acquainted with computers. The objective was to develop computer applications that highlighted information to satisfy senior executives' needs. Typically, an EIS provides only data that supported executive level decisions, not all company data.

Today, the application of EIS is not only in typical corporate hierarchies, but also at lower corporate levels. As some client service companies adopt the latest enterprise information systems, employees can use their personal computers to get access to the company's data and identify information relevant to their decision making. This arrangement  provides relevant information to upper and lower corporate levels.

Components 
EIS components can typically be classified as:
 Hardware
 Software
 User interface
 Telecommunications

Hardware 
When talking about computer hardware for an EIS environment, we should focus on the hardware that meets the executive's need. The executive must be put first and the executive's needs must be defined before the hardware can be selected. The basic hardware needed for a typical EIS includes four components: 
 Input data-entry devices. These devices allow the executive to enter, verify, and update data immediately
 The central processing unit (CPU), which is the most important because it controls the other computer system components
 Data storage files. The executive can use this part to save useful business information, and this part also helps the executive to search historical business information easily
 Output devices, which provide a visual or permanent record for the executive to save or read. This device refers to the visual output device such as monitor or printer

In addition, with the advent of local area networks (LAN), several EIS products for networked workstations became available. These systems require less support and less expensive computer hardware. They also increase EIS information access to more company users.

Software 
Choosing the appropriate software is vital to an effective EIS. Therefore, the software components and how they integrate the data into one system are important. A typical EIS includes four software components:
 Text: handling software—documents are typically text-based
 Database: heterogeneous databases on a range of vendor-specific and open computer platforms help executives access both internal and external data
 Graphic base: graphics can turn volumes of text and statistics into visual information for executives. Typical graphic types are: time series charts, scatter diagrams, maps, motion graphics, sequence charts, and comparison-oriented graphs (i.e., bar charts)
 Model base—EIS models contain routine and special statistical, financial, and other quantitative analysis

User interface 
An EIS must be efficient to retrieve relevant data for decision makers, so the user interface is very important. Several types of interfaces can be available to the EIS structure, such as scheduled reports, questions/answers, menu driven, command language, natural language, and input/output.

Telecommunication 
As decentralizing is becoming a trend in companies, telecommunications plays a pivotal role in networked information systems. Transmitting data from one place to another has become crucial for establishing a reliable network. In addition, telecommunications within an EIS can accelerate the need for access to distributed data. It can be both by scientific and business means.

Applications 
EIS helps executives find data according to user-defined criteria and promote information-based insight and understanding. Unlike a traditional management information system presentation, EIS can distinguish between vital and seldom-used data, and track different key critical activities for executives, both which are helpful in evaluating if the company is meeting its corporate objectives. After realizing its advantages, people have applied EIS in many areas, especially, in manufacturing, marketing, and finance areas.

Manufacturing 
Manufacturing is the transformation of raw materials into finished goods for sale, or intermediate processes involving the production or finishing of semi-manufactures. It is a large branch of industry and of secondary production. Manufacturing operational control focuses on day-to-day operations, and the central idea of this process is effectiveness.

Marketing 
In an organization, marketing executives' duty is managing available marketing resources to create a more effective future. For this, they need make judgments about risk and uncertainty of a project and its impact on the company in short term and long term. To assist marketing executives in making effective marketing decisions, an EIS can be applied. EIS provides sales forecasting, which can allow the market executive to compare sales forecast with past sales. EIS also offers an approach to product price, which is found in venture analysis. The market executive can evaluate pricing as related to competition along with the relationship of product quality with price charged. In summary,  EIS software package enables marketing executives to manipulate the data by looking for trends, performing audits of the sales data, and calculating totals, averages, changes, variances, or ratios.

Financial analysis 
Financial analysis is one of the most important steps to companies today. Executives needs to use financial ratios and cash flow analysis to estimate the trends and make capital investment decisions. An EIS integrates planning or budgeting with control of performance reporting, and it can be extremely helpful to finance executives. EIS focuses on financial performance accountability, and recognizes the importance of cost standards and flexible budgeting in developing the quality of information provided for all executive levels.

Advantages and disadvantages

Advantages of ESS 
 Easy for upper-level executives to use, extensive computer experience is not required in operations
 Provides strong drill-down capabilities to better analyze the given information.
 Information that is provided is better understood
 EIS provides timely delivery of information. Management can make decisions promptly.
 Improves tracking information
 Offers efficiency to decision makers

Disadvantages of ESS 
 System dependent
 Limited functionality, by design
 Information overload for some managers
 Benefits hard to quantify
 High implementation costs
 System may become slow, large, and hard to manage
 Need good internal processes for data management
 May lead to less reliable and less secure data
 Excessive cost for small company

Future trends 

This trend frees executives from learning different computer operating systems, and substantially decreases implementation costs. Because this trend includes using existing software applications, executives don't need to learn a new or special language for the EIS package. 

Interactive visualizations are trending. 3D visualizations in a VR/AR environment looks like a possibility already. Also, predictive analytics open the doors for (machine) learning what is going to be next based on data from the past. While the data processing can be done in many ways, learning is not completely unsupervised. There is still a good deal of classification using expert personnel analysis. In near realtime scenarios, latencies while doing ML can be a barrier. Optimizing data models, size and processing path/time are ongoing work. As more data is captured at different data stages in not only EIS apps but also other enterprise apps, audio and video tagging can catalyse data discovery.

See also 
 Enterprise performance management
 Enterprise architecture
 Management information system

References 

 Thierauf, Robert J. Executive Information System: A Guide for Senior Management and MIS Professionals. Quorum Books, 1991
 Executive information systems (January 1994). Retrieved June 17, 2006, from https://web.archive.org/web/20060620081931/http://www.cs.ui.ac.id/staf/sjarif/eis.htm
 Rockart, John F. and De Long, David W. (1988) Executive Support Systems: The Emergence of Top Management Computer Use, Business One Irwin, 
 Salmeron, Jose L. and Herrero, Ines. An AHP-based methodology to rank critical success factors of executive information systems. Computer Standards & Interfaces, Volume 28, Issue 1, July 2005, pp. 1–12.
 Salmeron, Jose L. EIS Success: Keys and difficulties in major companies. Technovation Volume 23, Issue 1, 2003, pp. 35–38
 Salmeron, Jose L. EIS Evolution in Large Spanish Businesses. Information & Management  Volume 40, Issue 1, 2002, pp. 41–50
 Salmeron, Jose L. EIS profitability, costs and benefits: An evolutionary approach. Industrial Management & Data Systems Volume 102, Issue 5–6, 2002, pp. 284–288
 Salmeron, Jose L. EIS data: Findings from an evolutionary study. Journal of Systems and Software Volume 64, Issue 2, 2002, pp. 111–114

External links 
 The development and use of Executive Information Systems

Information systems
Decision support systems
Business software
Information technology management
Management systems